Variety Cruises is a private yacht cruise line based in Athens, Greece. It owns and operates eight small cruise ships and four yachts. The company was founded in 2006 by Lakis Venetopoulos.

History 
Variety Cruises was established in 2006 following the merge of Zeus Tours & Yacht Cruises, a third generation cruise and tourism business operating since 1949, and Hellas Yachts, which started operating small ships cruises in 1993. The company’s history dates back to 1949 when the original founder of Zeus Cruises built the company’s first ship Eleutherios in order to fill a need for educational travel in Greece. Diogenis Venetopoulos was a historian turned tour-guide.

Market position
The cruise lines ships have been offering scheduled and specialized charter cruises since 1949 to clients including Mercedes, various Alumni Groups including Museum of Natural History, MIT, Harvard University, National Geographic Lindblad  among others.

The company has established itself as one of the pioneers in theme cruises including gay and lesbian-themed cruises. Constantine Venetopoulos, one of the cruise lines' ambassadors, heads the International Gay and Lesbian Travel Association division of the company.

Destinations
Variety Cruises is known for visiting off the beaten track destinations including The Gambia, in the Rivers of West Africa among other destinations. The cruise lines' first destination was Greece, but since the company's expansion a number of destinations include the Adriatic Sea, Costa Rica & Panama, Cuba, the Canary Islands, Seychelles, and Cape Verde. The company's West Africa destination was featured by CNN for their Rivers of West Africa program.

Fleet
Variety Cruises runs a fleet of eight small cruise ships, in addition to owning and renting a fleet of 4 private yachts. The company's flagship is the Variety Voyager, followed by the Galileo, the Panorama, Panorama II, the Harmony V, the Harmony G, the Pegasos, and the Callisto. The company also owns a fleet of smaller yachts solely available for charter including the Obsession, the Absolute King, Christiane, and the Monte Carlo.

Corporate responsibility
The company is closely involved with the local communities visited, with various sustainable action projects including the Kuntaur Film Festival. In 2013, the company founded a school project in The Gambia entitled The Lamin Koto School Project

References

Cruise lines
Companies based in Athens